Erskine Sanford (November 19, 1885 – July 7, 1969) was an American actor on the stage, radio and motion pictures. Long associated with the Theatre Guild, he later joined Orson Welles's Mercury Theatre company and appeared in several of Welles's films, including Citizen Kane (1941), in which he played Herbert Carter, the bumbling, perspiring newspaper editor.

Biography
Erskine Sanford was born in Trinidad, Colorado, and was educated at the Horace Mann School in New York City. Beginning his acting career with Minnie Maddern Fiske's company, he made his professional debut in Leah Kleschna. He appeared in The Blue Bird and The Piper (1910–11) at the New Theatre in New York City, and in Shakespearean repertory with Ben Greet.

For some 15 years he was associated with the Theatre Guild, playing roles on Broadway and on tour, including performances of Porgy and Strange Interlude on the London stage.

In Kenosha, Wisconsin, Sanford first met Orson Welles in 1922, when the seven-year-old boy came backstage to meet him after a touring performance of Mr. Pim Passes By. Years later, Sanford left the Theatre Guild to join Welles's Mercury Theatre company, and made his Mercury debut in the 1938 stage production of Heartbreak House. Appearing as Mazzini Dunn, Sanford reprised the role he had created 18 years before in the Theatre Guild's world premiere production.

In 1941, Sanford married psychiatric nursing pioneer Adele Poston, but the marriage lasted only a short time.

Theatre credits

Filmography

Radio credits

References

External links

 

 Photograph of Erskine Sanford as Alan Archdale in Porgy (1927)  — New York Public Library

1885 births
1969 deaths
American male film actors
American male radio actors
American male stage actors
Male actors from California
20th-century American male actors
Horace Mann School alumni